Apopyllus silvestrii is a spider species in the genus Apopyllus found in Peru, Bolivia, Brazil, Argentina and Chile.

See also
 List of Gnaphosidae species

External links

Gnaphosidae
Spiders of South America
Spiders described in 1905